This is a list of the Canadian Hot 100 number-one singles of 2016. The Canadian  Hot 100 is a chart that ranks the best-performing singles of Canada. Its data, published by Billboard magazine and compiled by Nielsen SoundScan, is based collectively on each single's weekly physical and digital sales, as well as airplay and streaming.

Note that Billboard publishes charts with an issue date approximately 10–11 days in advance.

Chart history

See also
List of number-one digital songs of 2016 (Canada)
List of number-one albums of 2016 (Canada)

References

Canada Hot 100
2016
2016 in Canadian music